Tubig at Langis ( / ) is a 2016 Philippine drama television series directed by FM Reyes. The series is starred by Cristine Reyes, Zanjoe Marudo, and Isabelle Daza and premiered on ABS-CBN's Kapamilya Gold afternoon block and worldwide on The Filipino Channel on February 1, 2016 to September 2, 2016, replacing All of Me. 

The show ended on September 2, 2016, concluding the first to third season with 151 episodes.

Series overview

Episode List

Season 1

Season 2

Season 3: Ang Pagtatapos

Ang Ending na Hindi mo Dapat Dedmahin

References

Lists of Philippine drama television series episodes